There are two species of snake named Jan's snail-eater:
 Dipsas alternans
 Dipsas incerta